Petworth Park New Ground is a cricket ground in the shadow of Petworth House, Petworth, Sussex.  The first recorded match on the ground was in 1844, when Petworth Cricket Club played the Marylebone Cricket Club in the first first-class match held at the ground.  From 1844–1845, the ground held two further first-class matches when Petworth Cricket Club played Hampshire and the Marylebone Cricket Club.  Sussex played a single first-class match at the ground against Surrey in 1849.

Despite the final recorded match on the ground being in 1961 when Petworth played South Hampstead, the ground continues to be used to this day and in local domestic cricket is the home venue of Petworth Park Cricket Club.

References

External links
Petworth Park New Ground at CricketArchive
Petworth Park New Ground at ESPNcricinfo

Cricket grounds in West Sussex
Sports venues completed in 1844
Petworth
1844 establishments in England